Garrett–Evangelical Theological Seminary (G-ETS) is a private seminary and graduate school of theology related to the United Methodist Church.  It is located in Evanston, Illinois, on the campus of Northwestern University. The seminary offers a number of masters and doctoral-level degree programs. The Seminary’s PhD program is offered with cooperation of Northwestern University graduate departments.

History
Garrett-Evangelical is the result of the interweaving of three institutions:
 Founded in 1853 by Eliza Clark Garrett, Garrett Biblical Institute was the first Methodist seminary in the Midwest. It was established by the same group who founded Northwestern University, and both institutions have shared a campus in Evanston since their founding days. Its founders hoped that the school would shape mind and spirit for an educated clergy, a controversial topic as many local congregations looked with suspicion upon institutions of higher learning. Both Garrett and Northwestern University were early expressions of Methodists’ deep commitment to higher learning and making that learning increasingly accessible for leaders of the church and civil society.
 The Chicago Training School, established in 1885, was an important force for women in ministry and for developing social and educational service agencies throughout Chicago. Its primary mission was to train female leaders to advocate for the poorest residents of the city, many of which were either recently emigrated from Europe, or the formerly enslaved communities from southern states who made their way north. The Chicago Training School merged with Garrett Biblical Institute in 1934, forming Garrett Theological Seminary.
 Evangelical Theological Seminary, located in Naperville and founded as a seminary of the Evangelical Church (later the Evangelical United Brethren) in 1873, and was originally founded to serve the needs of the growing German-speaking immigrant communities. Garrett-Evangelical was formed in 1974 when the Garrett Theological Seminary in Evanston merged with the Evangelical Theological Seminary in Naperville, Illinois (both UMC schools). The merged school occupied the Garrett campus.

Garrett-Evangelical is on the campus of Northwestern University and continues many associations with the university. Both institutions were founded by the same clergy of Methodists in the mid-nineteenth century. Garrett was an institution that specialized in preparing women for ministry. The Chicago Training School for Home and Foreign Missions for women was merged into Garrett Biblical Institute in 1930. Dr. Georgia Harkness was the first woman to hold the position of professor of theology at any seminary in the United States. The Center for the Church and the Black Experience was one of the earliest centers focusing on religion, ministry and the African American experience.

Collaborations

Northwestern University
Garrett-Evangelical and Northwestern University have a relationship that is almost a century and a half old. Common founders established both institutions to provide an educated ministry for an educated church. Over the decades, the institutions have shared numerous resources, including courses, buildings, faculties, libraries, parking, and technology.

Today, the Garrett-Evangelical learning community is deeply enhanced through its relationship with Northwestern:
 Library resources and access (both physical and virtual);
 E-mail and other forms of information technology;
 Ph.D. coursework and dissertation advising;
 Recreational facilities and opportunities;
Cross registration
 International student assistance; 
 Many cultural events and special lectures and programs.

The Association of Chicago Theological Schools
The Chicago area boasts the greatest concentration of seminaries per capita of anywhere in the U.S. The Chicago area schools are organized into a cluster called The Association of Chicago Theological Schools. Garrett-Evangelical is one of the 11 member schools. The ACTS website states:
Together, the schools within ACTS offer a rich network of resources for theological education, making the association one of the outstanding centers of theological education in the world. Available to the approximately 3,000 students currently enrolled at its member schools is a faculty of more than 350, more than 1,000 courses offered annually, and library collections of 1.7 million volumes and nearly 5,000 currently received periodical subscriptions.

Ecumenical Theological Seminary Program
Garrett-Evangelical cooperates with the Ecumenical Theological Seminary in Detroit in a program that enables students to take up to half of their work toward a master's degree in Detroit.

Dual Degree in Social Work with Loyola University
Garrett-Evangelical and the School of Social Work of Loyola University of Chicago have a cooperative agreement for a dual degree program leading to the MSW at Loyola and the M.Div. at Garrett-Evangelical. Selected courses may be applied to the respective degrees at each school. Students must be admitted to both schools.

Seminary Consortium for Urban Pastoral Education
Garrett-Evangelical has historically collaborated with SCUPE (Seminary Consortium for Urban Pastoral Education), which used to exist as a program to empower seminarians for urban ministry. In February 2017, SCUPE underwent restructuring and became OMNIA Institute for Contextual Leadership, which is now focused on global training in all walks of life. As OMNIA moves its mission away from the seminary focus, it has maintained its relationship with Garrett-Evangelical, but classes no longer count for credit. In place of the SCUPE classes, Garrett-Evangelical has worked to offer more contextually appropriate and public theology-focused classes.

Anabaptist Mennonite Biblical Seminary
Garrett-Evangelical and Anabaptist Mennonite Biblical Seminary (AMBS) have partnered to provide students at AMBS seeking ordination in the United Methodist Church the opportunity to earn a certificate in United Methodist Studies from Garrett-Evangelical. In return, AMBS will provide a set of courses for a concentration and/or certificate in Peace Studies for Garrett-Evangelical students.

Some of these courses will be made available online, some by intensive courses in January and the summer, and some during regular semester terms on the campuses in Evanston or Elkhart.  Another component of the partnership is that each school will also provide staff to advise students in fulfilling the expectations for these certificates.

Notable alumni

 Edsel Albert Ammons (B.D., 1956) - a bishop of the United Methodist Church
 Hobart Baumann Amstutz (B.D.) - a bishop of The Methodist Church
 James Hal Cone (M.Div. and Ph.D.) - father of Black Liberation Theology
 Don Wendell Holter (B.D., 1930) - a bishop of the United Methodist Church
 Bruce Johnson - a Methodist minister who worked closely with the Young Lords in Chicago
 Jonathan D. Keaton (M.Div., 1971; S.T.D., 1979) - a bishop of the United Methodist Church
 David J. Lawson (B.D., 1959) - a bishop of the United Methodist Church
 George McGovern (No degree, 1946) - historian, politician, and 1972 Democratic presidential candidate
 J. Gordon Melton (M.Div., 1968) - a research specialist in religion and New Religious Movements
 Smokie Norful (attended) - American gospel singer and pianist who won a Grammy at the 47th Annual Grammy Awards for Best Contemporary Soul Gospel Album in 2004
 Lloyd John Ogilvie (M.Theology) - Presbyterian minister, author, and former Chaplain of the United States Senate
Emilie Townes (Ph.D. 1989) womanist theologian and dean of Vanderbilt University Divinity School
 John S. Stamm (graduate of Evangelical Theological Seminary-Naperville, Illinois [E.T.S.]) - bishop of the Evangelical Church
 John McKendree Springer (B.D. from Garrett Biblical Institute, 1901) - pioneering Methodist missionary in Africa and bishop
 Elmer Towns (M.R.E. from Garrett Theological Seminary) - co-founder of Liberty University
 Bruce R. Ough (M.Div., 1978) - a bishop of the United Methodist Church
 Henry C. Schadeberg (B.D., 1941) - politician
 James Zwerg - a freedom rider before attending seminary

Former and current faculty
 Edsel Albert Ammons - professor, 1968–76
 Ernest T. Campbell - professor of homiletics, 1982–1989 
 Ted Campbell - former president and professor of church history; currently professor of church history and Wesleyan studies at SMU
 Wayne K. Clymer - professor of Pastoral Care, 1946–57; dean, 1957–67; president, 1967-72 (all at Evangelical Theological Seminary, Naperville, Illinois); bishop of the United Methodist Church (1972-)
 Georgia Harkness
 Don Wendell Holter - professor of church history and missions (1949–58); then founding president of St. Paul School of Theology
 Jonathan D. Keaton - graduate teaching assistant in communications, ethics and society, and church and the Black experience (1970s at Garrett and Garrett-Evangelical)
 Daniel Parish Kidder - professor of homiletics.  Editor, and author of Mormonism and the Mormons (1844),  Sketches of Residence and Travel in Brazil (1845),  The Fratricide "Reminiscences of The West India Islands: (1851),  Treatise on Homiletics (1864, 1884), The Christian Pastorate (1871);  He also edited THE SUNDAY-SCHOLAR'S MIRROR: A Monthly Magazine for Children (1850-1854)
 Helmer Ringgren
 Rosemary Radford Ruether — Roman Catholic feminist scholar
 John S. Stamm - professor of systematic theology at E.T.S. (1919–26)
 K. K. Yeo - Harry R. Kendall Professor of New Testament, 1996–

References

External links
 Official website

 
1853 establishments in Illinois
Educational institutions established in 1853
Northwestern University
Seminaries and theological colleges in Illinois
United Methodist seminaries
Universities and colleges affiliated with the United Methodist Church
Education in Evanston, Illinois
Universities and colleges in Cook County, Illinois
Graduate schools in the United States